Ihor Ivanovych Tantsyura is a Ukrainian general and Commander of the Territorial Defense Forces since 15 May 2022.

As of 2013, head of the 169th training center of the Ground Forces of the Armed Forces of Ukraine.

In 2019, Chief of Staff - First Deputy Commander of the Joint Forces Operation. In 2022, Chief of Staff and Deputy Commander of the Ground Forces of the Armed Forces of Ukraine. On May 15, 2022, he was appointed Commander of the Territorial Defense Forces of the Armed Forces of Ukraine.

References

Ukrainian generals
Living people
Year of birth missing (living people)
Ukrainian military personnel of the 2022 Russian invasion of Ukraine